Huang Xueqin (born in 1988) is a #MeToo activist, women's rights activist, and independent journalist in China. Before working as an independent journalist, Huang served as an investigative journalist for several newspapers in Guangzhou, Guangdong Province, China. In September 2021, she and another activist, Wang Jianbing, disappeared and were believed to have been detained on charges of subversion of state power.
In 2022, she received the Wallis Annenberg Justice for Women Journalists Award from the International Women's Media Foundation (IWMF), given to a journalist who is unjustly imprisoned.

Career

Sexual Harassment Report on Chinese Women Journalists 
In October 2017, Huang initiated a survey on Chinese women Journalists' experience on sexual harassment and collected 416 answers. On March 7, 2018, based on this survey, a Sexual Harassment Report on Chinese Women Journalists were released. According to the report, over 80% of women journalists had experience of being sexually harassed, 42.2% of women journalists who participated in the survey experienced sexual harassment more than one time.

#MeToo in China

Beihang University Incident
In October 2017, sexual harassment survivor, Beihang University Ph.D. graduate, Luo Xixi reported anonymously to the university that her former Ph.D. advisor, "Changjiang Scholar" Chen Xiaowu had been harassing his graduate students for years. However, the university did not respond to her report. Meanwhile, she saw Huang's survey on Chinese women Journalists' experience on sexual harassment, and sought help from Huang. They created an alliance called "Hard Candy" and exposed Chen Xiaowu's behaviors on January 1, 2018, on Weibo and received more than three million views within a day. In response, the university revoked Chen Xiaowu's teaching credentials, while the Ministry of Education revoked his "Changjiang Scholar" title. This marked the start of China's #MeToo movement.

Subsequently, Huang started several campaigns to support many #MeToo survivors.

Detention in 2019  
On June 9, 2019, Huang participated in a protest against the 2019 Hong Kong extradition bill, and wrote about her experience on the platform Matters. On June 11, she posted on her social media and stated that Guangzhou police harassed her because of her writing the article about Hong Kong protesters. She said her parents were "terrified". Subsequently, in October 2019, Guangzhou police arrested her in the name of "Picking quarrels and provoking trouble". On January 17, 2020, Huang was released on bail.

Detention in 2021
On September 19, 2021, Huang and workers’ rights advocate Wang Jianbing went missing and subsequently lost contact in Guangzhou. Huang was due to start her study in development studies at the University of Sussex after receiving a Chevening Scholarship, and Wang was accompanying her before her planned flight. A human rights organisation said that a person familiar with the matter has stated that Wang and Huang may be detained for investigation on charges of inciting subversion of state power, which involved daily gatherings of friends at Wang's home. In November 2021, it was confirmed that have been arrested and their families have received arrest notices issued by the Guangzhou Public Security Bureau. The notice stated that they were arrested by the Guangzhou Public Security Bureau on suspicion of inciting subversion of state power' and are now being held in the No. 1 Detention Center in Guangzhou.

References

External links
 记录我的“反送中”大游行

Living people
Chinese activists
Chinese feminists
Chinese journalists
1988 births
Chinese prisoners and detainees